Bertram Building, also known as Bertram Store, is a historic building at 1601 Guadalupe Street in Austin, Texas.

References

National Register of Historic Places in Austin, Texas
Buildings and structures completed in 1866